Mi-Soul, is a radio station on DAB and online playing soul, R&B, house and other genres including hip-hop, reggae and DnB.

Mi-Soul was founded by Gordon Mac (formerly Kiss FM and Colourful Radio), with long-time business partner Martin Strivens. Having left Colourful in June 2011, Mac launched Mi-Soul as an internet radio station in July 2012. It commenced broadcasting on the Switch London 2 digital radio network on 27 June 2015.

Mi-Soul presenters and DJs include some of the UK's legendary names, including: Lindsay Wesker, Jazzie B, Jumpin Jack Frost, Brandon Block, and Dave VJ (formerly of Kiss); Femi Fem, Mastermind, Greg Edwards (formerly Capital Radio); George Kay, Jigs, Calvin Francis, and Natty B (formerly Choice FM); Ronnie Herel, and DJ Bailey (formerly BBC Radio 1Xtra); and Mike Vitti (formerly Jazz FM). Other presenters to have appeared include the late Colin Faver and Paul Trouble Anderson.

References

External links 
 Official Website

Radio stations in London
Media and communications in the London Borough of Lewisham